Jalal Deh (also Romanized as Jalāl Deh) is a village in Dolfak Rural District, Khorgam District, Rudbar County, Gilan Province, Iran. At the 2006 census, its population was 87, in 26 families.

References 

Populated places in Rudbar County